Exeter Book Riddle 47 (according to the numbering of the Anglo-Saxon Poetic Records) is one of the most famous of the Old English riddles found in the later tenth-century Exeter Book. Its solution is 'book-worm' or 'moth'.

Text

Glossary

Interpretation

The extensive commentary on this riddle is concisely summarised by Cavell, and more fully by Foys.

Editions

 Krapp, George Philip and Elliott Van Kirk Dobbie (eds), The Exeter Book, The Anglo-Saxon Poetic Records, 3 (New York: Columbia University Press, 1936), p. 236.
 Williamson, Craig (ed.), The Old English Riddles of the Exeter Book (Chapel Hill: University of North Carolina Press, 1977).
 Muir, Bernard J. (ed.), The Exeter Anthology of Old English Poetry: An Edition of Exeter Dean and Chapter MS 3501, 2nd edn, 2 vols (Exeter: Exeter University Press, 2000).
 Foys, Martin et al. (eds.) Old English Poetry in Facsimile Project, (Madison, WI: Center for the History of Print and Digital Culture, 2019-). Online edition annotated and linked to digital facsimile, with a modern translation.

Recordings

 Michael D. C. Drout, 'Riddle 47', performed from the Anglo-Saxon Poetic Records edition (29 October 2007).

References

Riddles
Old English literature
Old English poetry